Death and Nightingales (also written Death & Nightingales) is a 2018 television historical drama miniseries, based on the 1992 novel of the same name by author Eugene McCabe. The series stars Ann Skelly, Jamie Dornan and Matthew Rhys. It started broadcast on RTÉ One in Republic of Ireland on 26 November 2018, and two days later in the UK on BBC Two.

Cast
Ann Skelly as Beth Winters, stepdaughter to Billy Winters
Matthew Rhys as Billy Winters, Beth's stepfather and owner of Clonuala
 Jamie Dornan as Liam Ward
 Charlene McKenna as Mercy Boyle, a maid at Clonuala
 Seán McGinley as Jimmy Donnelly, the Roman Catholic Bishop of Clogher
 Martin McCann as Frank Blessing, a friend of Liam
 Michael Smiley as Dummy McGonnell, a mute
 Francis Magee as Mickey Dolphin, a farmhand at Clonuala
 Valene Kane as Catherine Winters, Beth's mother

Production
Jamie Dornan and writer Allan Cubitt, the writer of the series, had previously collaborated on The Fall. The show was filmed in County Fermanagh and at Springhill House, near Moneymore in County Londonderry in Northern Ireland  Cubbit revealed that the series was a "Brexit warning", saying "we can't afford to go back" to how things were before the Northern Irish peace process.

Episodes

Release
Red Arrow Studios distributed the series, and the first episode premiered on BBC Two on 28 November 2018. In the United States, the series will begin airing on Starz on 16 May 2021.

Critical reception

The series was met with lukewarm reviews from critics.  On the review aggregation website Rotten Tomatoes, the series holds a 73% approval rating with an average rating of 6.0 out of 10 based on 11 reviews. Gerard O'Donovan of The Daily Telegraph gave show four stars out of five, calling it "the rarest of dramatic gems - one that pushes and challenges understanding - and it's impossible not to be drawn in." The Times' Carol Midgley was slightly more critical, deeming it "a heavy drama with lean dialogue and precious little mirth, but I'm being seduced." Ed Cumming, writing for The Independent, gave the show three stars out of five, writing "The desired tone, I think, is a kind of Ulster version of Deadwood, a creation parable for the problems of the 20th century, but there is a fine line between powerful and self-parodic."

References

External links
 
 

2018 British television series debuts
2018 British television series endings
2010s British drama television series
2010s British television miniseries
Television series set in the 1880s
BBC television dramas
BBC high definition shows
English-language television shows
Starz original programming
Television shows based on Irish novels